The Donkey King is a 2018 Pakistani computer animated comedy film, directed by Aziz Jindani. The film features the voices of Jan Rambo, Ismail Tara, Hina Dilpazeer, Ghulam Mohiuddin, and Jawed Sheikh. It was released in Pakistan on 13 October 2018 by Geo Films and Talisman Studios. After its national success, it became the first Pakistani film to be dubbed into ten languages for multiple international theatrical releases, distributed worldwide by Annalisa Zanierato, for Pantera Film.

It is currently Pakistan's highest-grossing animated feature film ever, and also one of the highest-grossing Pakistani films overall.

Plot
Mangu is an insignificant donkey washer who dreams of fame and riches. Though his uncle, Pehelwan Chacha discourages his dreams, the spirit of his father Changu often appears to tell him to keep dreaming. Mangu's land is ruled by the elite Big Cats who live off the herbivores. Many protests are often held at this by the public, which are futile. While delivering his laundry, Mangu enters the castle and meets the crafty senior adviser, Miss Fitna. Meanwhile, the aging King Badshah Khan informs Fitna that he wishes to forfeit the crown to his incompetent and self absorbed child Shahzada Khan. When Fitna influences the animals against this through propaganda, the King decides on a form of 'democracy', thinking that no one will be able to stand up to Shahzada.

Miss Fitna and her cohorts vainly look for a suitable candidate. Then Miss Fitna remembers the naive donkey who will be easily influenced. Mangu agrees to the campaign after encouragement from his father. He and Shahzada compete for the crown through many hilarious ways, like press talks and rap battles, while Fitna supports Mangu through the news' influence and reverse psychology. Eventually, Mangu makes an inspirational speech from the bottom of his heart that wins over the animals. The Cats are exiled and Mangu starts to live a life of luxury in the palace and neglects his duties. Meanwhile, Fitna secretly has an agenda of her own. She serves the human ringmaster and kidnaps the animals for his circus. Mangu accidentally stumbles upon their prison. He realizes his mistakes, apologizes to the animals and stops Fitna's party. Fitna falls off the cliff into the sea. The public and the Cats fix their problems and accept Mangu as their King. Meanwhile, Changu's spirit moves on, convinced his son achieved his dreams.

Cast

Pakistani version 
 Afzal Khan as Jan Mangu, a washer-donkey and king-to-be of Azadnagar 
 Hina Dilpazeer as Miss Fitna, a red fox who is personal secretary to the king
 Ghulam Mohiuddin as Badshah Khan, a lion who is the king of Azadnagar
 Adeel Hashmi as Shahzada Khan, the son of Badshah Khan
 Faisal Qureshi as Breaking News, a monkey
 Salman Saqib Sheikh as Rangeela, a chameleon
 Jawed Sheikh as Changu, Mangu's father
 Ismail Tara as Pehalwan Chacha, Changu's brother and Subadar (Rhino)
 Shafaat Ali as Ronald Crump, a hippopotamus version of Donald Trump
 Irfan Khoosat as Jamboora, an chimpanzee who is the media house owner; and Raftaar, a tortoise
 Shabbir Jan as Sardar Chacha, a grizzly bear
 Sahiba Afzal as Mangu's love interest
 Ahsan Rahim as Mr. Propaganda, a siberian tiger
 Irfan Malik as Panoti, a zebra
 Ali Hassan as Raja Uncle
 Zirgham Amir Khan as a Khota
 TBA as Jake, a Hyena

English version 
Kenny Knox as Mangu
Mark Dohner as Prince Shazad
Bobbi Hartley as Miss Fitna
Jay Synder as Badshah Khan
Mike Pollock as Changu
Tyler Bunch as Uncle Perry
Jason Yudoff as Jambora 
Steve Tardio as Godzilla
Dave Wills as Zandar 
Billy Bob Thompson as Monkey News Reporter
Rory Mac Kaplan as Bad Luck Brian
David McDonald as Rapid, Lando
Jim O' Brian as Bull Bros
Starr Bursby as Rebecca Hippo

Production
In August 2018, the first look of the animated film was released, directed by Aziz Jindani, developed and produced by Talisman Studios and Geo Films. Jindani revealed that he had the idea of the film since 2003, and had started working on the film in 2013 while working on his Commander Safeguard animated series. The film stars the voices of Jan Rambo, Ismail Tara, Hina Dilpazeer, Ghulam Mohiuddin, Shabbir Jan, Jawed Sheikh and others.

In 2016, Aziz founded Talisman Studios, an animation studio based in Karachi and begin the work on the Donkey King, the film was animated on Autodesk Maya & rendered on Fox Renderfarm.

The teaser of the film was released on August 20, and the trailer was released on September 23.

Release
The release date announced for the film was 13 October 2018, though it released a day earlier. It was premiered on the same day at Nueplex Cinemas, in DHA, Karachi.

As of 2020, Donkey King had been released in ten countries worldwide with local dubbings. It became the first Pakistani film to release in South Korea on 28 August 2019, and in Spain on 4 October 2019, where it was dubbed into three languages – Spanish, Catalan and Basque – and released under the titles El Rey Burro, El Rei Ruc and Asto Erregea respectively at 50 screens across the country. It released in Russia on 5 December with a Russian dub and across 100 screens in Turkey on 20 December in Turkish dub. It was scheduled to release in Colombia on 9 January 2020. It also released in Peru on 13 February 2020. The film released in China on 19 November 2021.

Home media 
The Donkey King had a world television premiere on three days of Eid al-Fitr, in May 2020 on Geo Entertainment and Geo News. It was the most watched television premiere in Pakistan.

Digital media 
On 23 June 2020, Janson Media released the trailer of The Donkey King where they told that it will be available for streaming on July 3; in UK, Canada and United States, the film is available to stream on Amazon Prime Video in English language.

Controversy
Prior to its release, a legal petition was made that demanded a ban on the film due to its title song making fun of the Raja caste. However, this was dismissed by the Islamabad High Court. Another political controversy involved the resemblance of the position of lead character to prime minister Imran Khan so as to mock the term of the Prime Minister and his government. Videos related to the film also appeared online, but Geo Films and Talisman Studios clarified them legally.

Box office
The film recorded the biggest opening in Pakistan for any animated film, collecting . It also recorded the biggest single day for animated films by hitting the  mark locally on its second day. The film earned  on its second weekend, which is more than the gross of its first weekend. It made  in its two weeks. It then also recorded second biggest third weekend for any Pakistani film, behind Jawani Phir Nahi Ani 2, by collecting , which is itself greater than its second weekend.

It crossed  in its sixth weekend, again making the weekend biggest for any Pakistani film as well as for any release on local box office.

The film was listed as #1 blockbuster Pakistani film of 2018 by Mohammad Kamran Jawaid of Dawn.

As of 4 December 2021, the international gross of the film has crossed , becoming second Pakistani film to do so after Jawani Phir Nahi Ani 2.

Soundtrack
Music video of "Donkey Raja" (Remix), directed by Ahsan Rahim with Zain Haleem as director of photography, was released on 9 October 2018, starring the voice cast themselves. Shuja Haider was nominated for "Donkey Raja" in category Best Playback Singer in 18th Lux Style Awards. As of July 2020, the soundtrack has received more than 100 million streams on YouTube, making it one of the most viewed Pakistani film Soundtrack.

See also
 List of Pakistani animated films
 List of Pakistani films of 2018
 Cartoon Network (Pakistani TV channel)

References

External links
 
 
The Donkey King Full Movie

Pakistani animated films
Pakistani comedy films
Pakistani children's films
2010s children's comedy films
Films scored by Shuja Haider
Films scored by Shani Arshad
Cultural depictions of Donald Trump
Animated films about bears
2018 films
Films about donkeys
Geo Films films
2018 computer-animated films
2018 comedy films